Hans Wesemann (27 November 1895, Nienburg on the Weser – 23 October 1971, Caracas) was a German journalist and Gestapo agent.

Early life
Wesemann was born into the family of Fritz Wesemann and his wife Margarethe Hars. He lived with them and his three siblings Sigrid, Greta and Freiedrich on a large farm.

Career
His breakthrough as a journalist came when he was able to interview Ernst Toller in 1923. Following his brief spell as President of the Bavarian Soviet Republic Toller was still being held in Niederschönenfeld prison and Wesemann had to overcome the suspicions of the warders to gain access to the political prisoner.

By 1935, Wesemann had become a Gestapo agent and conducted the first known kidnapping outside Germany by the Nazis. This was the kidnapping of German pacifist journalist Berthold Jacob in Basel, Switzerland, on 9 March 1935. He was subsequently arrested by the local police, and in September 1935 Jacob was returned to Switzerland following an intervention by the Swiss Federal Council. On 6 May 1936, Wesemann was declared guilty of the kidnapping by a Basel court and imprisoned until 1938. He was expelled from Switzerland upon his release.

References

External links
 

1895 births
1971 deaths
Gestapo agents
people convicted of kidnapping
German emigrants to Venezuela